Palmer Springs, Virginia is an area in Mecklenburg County, Virginia, United States. It is bordered to the west by Buggs Island Lake, to the north and east by Lake Gaston and to the south by the North Carolina state line. Its main cash crop has historically been tobacco.  Today, cattle farms are more prominent.  Also, tourism centered around the two lakes is a very important factor for the community.

Famous people
Odicci Alexander, former pitcher for the James Madison Dukes softball team
Rick Hendrick, NASCAR owner and car dealer. 
Woo Daves, winner of the 2000 Bassmaster Classic
James Solomon Russell, founded Saint Paul Normal and Industrial School, which later became Saint Paul's College.

Community organizations
Palmer Springs Volunteer Fire Department
Palmer Springs Community Center/Country Club and Crows Unlimited
Palmer Springs Family Care Center

Buggs Island Lake in Virginia, Kerr Lake, North Carolina

Recreation Areas
Palmers Point Park 
Liberty Hill Fishing Access and Trail
Samuel Buggs Island Wildlife Management Area
Steel Bridge Boat Ramp and Fishing Area

References

Towns in Mecklenburg County, Virginia